Abū Maʿbad (or Abū Bakr) ʿAbd Allāh ibn Kathīr al-Dārānī al-Makkī, better known as Ibn Kathir al-Makki (665-737 CE)(45-120AH), was one of the transmitters of the seven canonical Qira'at, or methods of reciting the Qur'an. His recitations were generally popular among the people of Mecca.

Biography
Al-Makki was born in Mecca and was one of the Tabi‘un. His family was of Iranian origin and were immigrants to Yemen. Al-Makki was a mawla ("freedman") of Amr ibn Alkama al-Kinani.

Al-Makki met the prophetic companions Anas ibn Malik and Abd Allah ibn al-Zubayr, and he learned his recitation method from a student of the prophetic companion Abd Allah ibn Abbas who in turn learned from Ubay ibn Ka'b and Zayd ibn Thabit who both learned directly from the prophet Muhammad. Al-Shafi‘i, the namesake of one of the four primary schools of thought in Sunni Islam, preferred to recite the Qur'an according to al-Makki's method.

He died in the year 737CE. The two primary transmitters of his method of recitation, Al-Bazzi and Qunbul, were Persian and Meccan respectively.

See also

Ten readers and transmitters 
Nafi‘ al-Madani
Qalun
Warsh
Ibn Kathir al-Makki
Al-Bazzi
Qunbul
Abu 'Amr ibn al-'Ala'
Ad-Duri
Al-Susi
Ibn Amir ad-Dimashqi
Hisham
Ibn Dhakwan
Aasim ibn Abi al-Najud
Shu'bah
Hafs
Hamzah az-Zaiyyat
Khalaf
Khallad
Al-Kisa'i
Al-Layth
Ad-Duri
Abu Ja'far
'Isa ibn Waddan
Ibn Jummaz
Ya'qub al-Yamani
Ruways
Rawh
Khalaf
Ishaq
Idris

References

737 deaths
Quranic readings
8th-century Iranian people
People from Mecca